Arthur De Greef was the defending champion but chose not to defend his title.

Pedro Sousa won the title after defeating Guilherme Clezar 6–4, 5–7, 6–2 in the final.

Seeds

Draw

Finals

Top half

Bottom half

References
Main Draw
Qualifying Draw

Svijany Open - Singles
2017 Singles